Hockey Club Junior Milano Vipers was an Italian professional ice hockey team from Milan. Founded in 1998 as Hockey Club Junior Milano, was renamed Vipers in 2000.
In June 2008 the organization was disbanded and replaced with Hockey Milano Rossoblu, a new club that employs much of the same office staff, but does not benefit from the same fundings and operates on a significantly tighter budget.
During their short History, the Vipers won 5 Scudetti, 3 Italy Cups and 3 Italian Super Cups.

External links
 Official Site

1998 establishments in Italy
2008 disestablishments in Italy
Defunct ice hockey teams in Italy
Ice hockey clubs established in 1998
Ice hockey clubs disestablished in 2008
Sport in Milan